William Workman, Will Workman, or Bill Workman may refer to:

 William Workman (baritone) (born 1940), American opera singer
 William Workman (Canadian politician) (1807–1878), Canadian politician
 William ('Don Julian') Workman (1802–1876), American pioneer 
 William H. Workman  (1839–1918), American politician, former mayor of Los Angeles
 Willy Workman (born 1990), American basketball player
 W. D. Workman Jr. (1914–1990), American journalist, writer, and politician
 Bill Workman (1940–2019), American businessman and politician

See also
 William Workman High School